Sharri MacDonald (born ) is an American politician from Maine. She served in the city council of Old Orchard Beach until 2013, when she was recalled after a controversial vote in the council to terminate Old Orchard Beach's Town Manager. She served in the Maine House of Representatives from 2012 to 2014 from District 132, as a member of the Republican Party.

Career

Old Orchard Beach City Council

Recall 

In March 2013, Town Manager Mark Pearson was terminated by a 4–3 vote of the Old Orchard Beach City Council, of which MacDonald was the chair. Disgruntled by the vote and lack of transparency, town citizens started a petition to recall the four members of the council who voted for the termination, including MacDonald. MacDonald commented that "People are upset, I understand", and said that she believes that "recalls lead to more divisiveness". In retaliation for the recall petition, another group started a recall petition against the three town members who had voted against Pearson's termination, meaning that all seven members of the Old Orchard Beach City Council were now facing a June recall election. Six of the seven members on the council, including MacDonald, were recalled.

Maine House of Representatives 
MacDonald was first elected to the Maine House of Representatives in 2012, defeating Roxanne Victoria Frenette with 53% of the vote. She was defeated by George Hogan in 2014. Later, she ran against Lori Gramlich in District 13 in 2018 and 2020, losing both times.

Medicaid expansion 
In 2013, MacDonald voted against a Medicaid expansion that she had previously voted for, one of only two Republicans to do so. The bill would have entered Maine in the Medicaid expansion program for three years, with the federal government covering the cost of the expansion.

Religious freedom 
In February 2014, MacDonald was noted for being one of few Republicans to vote against a religious freedom bill that had originated in the Maine Senate. The bill would have prevented the state of Maine from passing a law that infringed upon religious freedom unless there was a "compelling state interest" to do so.

Economy 
In 2013, MacDonald introduced a bill that would allow localities in Maine to increase the sales tax in their region, keeping the revenues. The bill passed 101-48 in the Maine House of Representatives, but failed in the Maine Senate.

Electoral history

2020

2018

2014

2012

References 

Year of birth missing (living people)
Living people
Women state legislators in Maine
People from Old Orchard Beach, Maine
Women city councillors in Maine
Republican Party members of the Maine House of Representatives
21st-century American politicians
21st-century American women politicians
Maine city council members